Rawshan Ara (3 August 1940– 24 June 2010), was a Bangladeshi film actress. Before joining film, She was employed in the doctor's profession. Poet Bande Ali Mia was her brother-in-law and Renowned film actress Suchitra Sen was her friend who also classmates of her school life. In 1959, she made her film debut in the movie Matir Pahar.

Early life 
Rowshan Ara was born on 3 August 1940 in Pabna. Her nickname was 'Daisy'.

Filmography

References

External links

1940 births
2010 deaths
Bangladeshi film actresses
Bengali actresses
Actresses in Bengali cinema
Bangladeshi physicians
People from Pabna District